The Gabon women's national football team is the national women's football team of Gabon and is overseen by the Gabonese Football Federation.

History

Results and fixtures

The following is a list of match results in the last 12 months, as well as any future matches that have been scheduled.

Legend

2023

Coaching staff

Current coaching staff

Managerial history

Players

Current squad
 The following players were named in February 2022 for the 2022 Africa Women Cup of Nations qualification tournament.
 Caps and goals accurate up to and including 30 October 2021.

Recent call-ups
The following players have been called up to a Gabon  squad in the past 12 months.

Records

*Active players in bold, statistics correct as of 19 September 2021.

Most capped players

Top goalscorers

Competitive record
 Champions   Runners-up   Third place   Fourth place

FIFA Women's World Cup

*Draws include knockout matches decided on penalty kicks.

Olympic Games

*Draws include knockout matches decided on penalty kicks.

Africa Women Cup of Nations

(The former format was amended as it did not comply with MOS:FLAG as discussed here)
*Draws include knockout matches decided on penalty kicks.

African Games

UNIFFAC Women's Cup

Honours

All−time record against FIFA recognized nations
The list shown below shows the Djibouti national football team all−time international record against opposing nations.
*As of xxxxxx after match against  xxxx.
Key

Record per opponent
*As ofxxxxx after match against  xxxxx.
Key

The following table shows Djibouti's all-time official international record per opponent:

All−time record against FIFA recognized nations

See also
Sport in Gabon
Football in Gabon
Women's football in Gabon

References

External links
FIFA Team Profile

 
African women's national association football teams